Crown Hills Community College (often abbreviated as CHCC), is a secondary school in Leicester, England with more than 1500 pupils and more than 200 staff members.

Crown Hills is a sports college and with a large field for sports, especially the football grounds called Goals.

References

External links

Secondary schools in Leicester
Community schools in Leicester